The Caulfield Guineas is a Melbourne Racing Club Group 1 Thoroughbred horse race held over 1600 metres (1 mile) at set weights for three-year-old horses at Caulfield Racecourse, Melbourne, Australia.  Total prize money is A$3 million.

The race is held annually on the second Saturday in October and forms part of the Melbourne Spring Racing Carnival at Caulfield Racecourse. The Guineas, as the race is known, starts the three-day Caulfield carnival; the G1 Toorak Handicap, G1 Caulfield Stakes and the fillies equivalent, the G1 The Thousand Guineas  are also held on Guineas day.

History

During World War II the race was run at Flemington Racecourse.

Regarded as one of the blue riband events for three-year-olds, the Guineas is regarded as a stallion making race for the winner, and has been won by a host of star gallopers who have gone on to multiple G1 success. These included Starspangledbanner (2010 G1 Oakleigh Plate, 2010 G1 Golden Jubilee Stakes), Whobegotyou (2009 G1 Yalumba Stakes), Weekend Hussler (six other G1 races including 2007 G1 Ascot Vale Stakes, 2008 G1 Randwick Guineas and 2008 G1 George Ryder Stakes). Earlier winners include celebrated champion sires Lonhro (2001, 11 G1 wins) and Redoute's Choice (1999, 4 G1 wins). Looking further back, other outstanding winners include Mahogany (1993, 8 G1 wins), Red Anchor (1984, 4 G1 wins), champion sprinter Manikato (12 official G1 wins, 18 wins in races that are classified as G1 today), 2YO Triple Crown winner Luskin Star (1977, 4 G1 wins), Surround (1976, first and only filly to win the weight-for-age championship of Australasia, the Cox Plate), Vain (1969, 6 G1 wins and champion sire), Storm Queen (1966, 5 G1 wins), the inaugural Australian Racing Hall of Fame inductee Tulloch (1957, 14 G1 wins), and Ajax (14 G1 wins and fellow Australian Racing Hall of Fame inductee).

Distance
 1881–1971 - 1 mile (~1600 metres)
 1972 onwards - 1600 metres (1 mile)

Grade
1886–1978 - Principal race
1979 onwards - Group 1

Double winners
Thoroughbreds that have won the Caulfield Guineas – W. S. Cox Plate double:
 Star Affair (1965), Rajah Sahib (1968), †Surround (1976), Red Anchor (1984)
Thoroughbreds that have won the Caulfield Guineas – Victoria Derby double:
 Wallace (1895), †Lady Wallace (1905), Patrobas (1915), Eusebius (1918), Rampion (1926), Liberal (1932), Theo (1934), Lucrative (1940), Great Britain (1942), Tulloch (1957), Coppelius (1962), Sovereign Red (1980), Grosvenor (1982), Red Anchor (1984), Mahogany (1993), Helenus (2002)

† filly

1922 racebook

Winners

 2021 - Anamoe
 2020 - Ole Kirk
 2019 - Super Seth
 2018 - The Autumn Sun
 2017 - Mighty Boss
 2016 - Divine Prophet
 2015 - Press Statement
 2014 - Shooting To Win
 2013 - Long John
 2012 - All Too Hard
 2011 - Helmet
 2010 - Anacheeva
 2009 - Starspangledbanner
 2008 - Whobegotyou
 2007 - Weekend Hussler
 2006 - Wonderful World
 2005 - God's Own
 2004 - Econsul
 2003 - In Top Swing
 2002 - Helenus
 2001 - Lonhro
 2000 - Show A Heart
 1999 - Redoute's Choice
 1998 - Kenwood Melody
 1997 - Encounter
 1996 - Alfa
 1995 - Our Maizcay
 1994 - St. Covet
 1993 - Mahogany
 1992 - Palace Reign
 1991 - Chortle
 1990 - Centro
 1989 - Procol Harum
 1988 - Vitalic
 1987 - Marwong
 1986 - Abaridy
 1985 - Drawn
 1984 - Red Anchor
 1983 - Beechcraft
 1982 - Grosvenor
 1981 - Binbinga
 1980 - Sovereign Red
 1979 - Runaway Kid
 1978 - Manikato
 1977 - Luskin Star
 1976 - Surround
 1975 - Sou'wester
 1974 - Kenmark
 1973 - Grand Cidium
 1972 - Sobar
 1971 - Beau Sovereign
 1970 - Dual Choice
 1969 - Vain
 1968 - Rajah Sahib
 1967 - Dark Purple
 1966 - Storm Queen
 1965 - Star Affair
 1964 - Yangtze
 1963 - Time And Tide
 1962 - Coppelius
 1961 - King Brian
 1960 - Lady Sybil
 1959 - Prince Lea
 1958 - Wiggle
 1957 - Tulloch
 1956 - Hot Spell
 1955 - Caranna
 1954 - King Boru
 1953 - Barfleur
 1952 - Bayside
 1951 - Hydrogen
 1950 - Merry Scout
 1949 - Iron Duke
 1948 - Phoibos
 1947 - Hororata
 1946 - Praetor
 1945 - † Attley / Royal Gem
 1944 - Kintore
 1943 - Lawrence
 1942 - Great Britain
 1941 - Tea Cake
 1940 - Lucrative
 1939 - High Caste
 1938 - Nuffield
 1937 - Ajax
 1936 - Beechwood
 1935 - Young Idea
 1934 - Theo
 1933 - Palphar
 1932 - Liberal
 1931 - Ammon Ra
 1930 - Green Wave
 1929 - Pentheus
 1928 - Balmerino
 1927 - Avant Courier
 1926 - Rampion
 1925 - Manacre
 1924 - Heroic
 1923 - King Carnival
 1922 - Soorak
 1921 - Demetrius
 1920 - Midilli
 1919 - Artilleryman
 1918 - Eusebius
 1917 - Thrice
 1916 - Ettefred
 1915 - Patrobas
 1914 - Blague
 1913 - Andelosia
 1912 - Burrawang
 1911 - Woolerina
 1910 - Danaus
 1909 - Malt King
 1908 - Parsee
 1907 - Master Foote
 1906 - Booran
 1905 - Lady Wallace
 1904 - Demas
 1903 - Sweet Nell
 1902 - Strata Florida
 1901 - Ibex
 1900 - Kinglike
 1899 - Tremarden
 1898 - Bobadil
 1897 - Aurum
 1896 - The Officer
 1895 - Wallace
 1894 - Cobbity
 1893 - Patron
 1892 - Autonomy
 1891 - Strathmore
 1890 - Annesley
 1889 - Rudolph
 1888 - Volley
 1887 - Carlyon
 1886 - Maddelina
 1885 - Ringmaster
 1884 - Sandal
 1883 - Sardius
 1882 - Fryingpan
 1881 - Wheatear

† Dead heat

See also
 List of Australian Group races
 Group races

References

Flat horse races for three-year-olds
Group 1 stakes races in Australia
Caulfield Racecourse